Infront Sports & Media is a sports marketing company based in Zug, Switzerland. The company handles the media and marketing rights for international sports events and federations and also provides sports services - such as advertising, sponsorship and hospitality. It represents all seven Olympic winter sport federations, several summer sport organizations and manages media rights for the FIS World Cup Events. Infront was created in late 2002 through the integration of CWL, Prisma and KirchSportAG.

History
Infront Sports & Media was founded in October 2002 with FIFA as its core business as the company who sold the television and radio broadcasts for the 2002 FIFA World Cup. The company originated from a merger of two existing Swiss-based marketing companies, CWL and Prisma Sports & Media. CWL was founded by Cesar Lüthi, who sold the business to the Kirch Group. In 2005 the company lost the right to resell the TV and radio rights in Europe, though it retained the ability to sell Asian rights, as part of a division of the rights by FIFA. Infront subsidy HBS won the contract to manage the TV and radio broadcast production. Two months later, the company hired President and CEO Phillippe Blatter, to replace departing chief Oscar Frei. The appointment of Blatter, who is the nephew of Sepp Blatter, the then President of FIFA, was criticized by author Andrew Jennings and Transparency International. During this time as chief executive, Phillippe Blatter was able to grow the company's revenues.

Until 2011 it was owned by a consortium of shareholders. In September 2011 – European private equity firm Bridgepoint reached an agreement to acquire the company. In February 2015, Chinese conglomerate Dalian Wanda won an auction to purchase Infront from Bridgepoint for more than €1 billion. In November of that same year, it was announced that Infront would merge with the World Triathlon Corporation (including the latter's Ironman brand) to form the Wanda Sports division.

Services 
Infront Sports & Media has 1000 employees in 14 countries. Infront Sports & Media supports media rights distribution, marketing concepts and sponsorship sales for sporting events as well as media production (host broadcasting, post production and archive management). Infront's subsidiary, Host Broadcast Services (HBS), manages television and radio signals for broadcasters at sports events such as the FIFA World Cup. Infront subsidiary, Omnigon helps sports and media companies, such as NASCAR, to develop mobile apps and websites.

On 4 June 2018, Infront announced the acquisition of leading European obstacle course event organiser XLETIX GmbH in a move that extends its footprint in the growing personal and corporate fitness sector.

In July 2018, Infront and FIDAL, the Italian Athletics Federation, announced a six-year partnership on Friday which will run until 2024. The agreement unveiled at a press conference in Rome, will see Infront and FIDAL collaborate at all levels of the federation's events and projects.

Notable work

Association football

Infront has supported the FIFA World Cup since 2002. It distributes the Asian media rights and manages the host broadcast production. Infront also works with the German Football Association (DFB), the Italian Lega Serie A and the Indonesian, Indonesia Super League. In 2016 Infront with Omnigon collaborated on several projects including digital services to the Serie A and mobile app development for the German Football Association's DFB Cup.

Infront's HBS subsidiary was awarded the Judge's award at the 2010 International Broadcasting Convention for its work helping FIFA broadcast the World Cup in stereoscopic 3D.

In 2011, Transparency International asked Fifa to be more open about possible conflicts of interest, when it was discovered that the president of Infront was Philippe Blatter, nephew to the president of Fifa, Sepp Blatter. Fifa said Blatter was not involved in awarding the deal to Infront.

Winter sports

Infront has media and/or sponsorship partnerships with all seven international federations of Winter Olympic sports: the International Ice Hockey Federation (since 1981), the International Ski Federation (since 1990), the International Biathlon Union (since 1992),, the International Bobsleigh and Skeleton Federation (since 1999), the International Luge Federation (since 1999), the International Skating Union (since 2015), and the World Curling Federation (since 2018). It also manages media and/or sponsorship rights to several events of the different FIS World Cups.

Other sports

Infront is a media and sponsorship partner for the European Handball Federation (since 1993) and the European Volleyball Confederation (since 1993).

In 2011, Infront became a partner of the World Triathlon Corporation, promoter of the Ironman Triathlon races. In 2018 it also became a partner for World Triathlon.

Infront signed a media rights partnership with Union Cycliste Internationale in 2012. It also has partnerships with several UCI World Tour races such as the Tour de Suisse, Tour de Romandie, Tour of Poland, Cadel Evans Great Ocean Road Race, E3 Saxo Bank Classic, Amstel Gold Race and the Flanders Classics.

In 2016, Infront became the media and sponsorship partner of the International Basketball Federation (FIBA) and the Badminton World Federation. In 2021, it became a media and sponsorship partner of the Professional Squash Association.

In China, Infront represents the Chinese Basketball Association and the Chinese national basketball team.

Notable employees
 Harald Griebel, developed marketing for the Ice Hockey World Championships from 1981 to 2008.

References

External links 
 
 Host Broadcast Services

Companies based in Zug
Mass media companies established in 2002
Sports management companies
Mass media companies of Switzerland
Privately held companies of Switzerland
Mass media in Zug
2002 establishments in Switzerland
Sports marketing
Dalian Wanda Group
Sports mass media in Switzerland
Companies established in 2002